Live Oak County is a county in the U.S. state of Texas. It was named for its native groves of live oak. George West is its county seat. Its population was 11,335 in the 2020 census.

Geography
It is home to the Choke Canyon Reservoir.

Major highways
  Interstate 37
  U.S. Highway 59
  Interstate 69W is currently under construction and will follow the current route of U.S. 59 in most places.
  U.S. Highway 281
  Interstate 69C is currently under construction and will follow the current route of U.S. 281 in most places south of George West.
  SH 72
  FM 99
  FM 624
  FM 799
  FM 833

Adjacent counties
 Karnes County (northeast)
 Bee County (east)
 San Patricio County (southeast)
 Jim Wells County (south)
 Duval County (southwest)
 McMullen County (west)
 Atascosa County (northwest)

Demographics

Note: the US Census treats Hispanic/Latino as an ethnic category. This table excludes Latinos from the racial categories and assigns them to a separate category. Hispanics/Latinos can be of any race.

As of the census of 2000, there were 12,309 people, 4,230 households, and 3,070 families residing in the county.  The population density was 12 people per square mile (5/km2).  There were 6,196 housing units at an average density of 6 per square mile (2/km2).  The racial makeup of the county was 87.28% White, 2.45% Black or African American, 0.41% Native American, 0.19% Asian, 0.02% Pacific Islander, 7.72% from other races, and 1.94% from two or more races.  38.05% of the population were Hispanic or Latino of any race.

There were 4,230 households, out of which 30.90% had children under the age of 18 living with them, 60.10% were married couples living together, 8.70% had a female householder with no husband present, and 27.40% were non-families. 23.90% of all households were made up of individuals, and 12.40% had someone living alone who was 65 years of age or older.  The average household size was 2.53 and the average family size was 3.00.

In the county, the population was spread out, with 22.30% under the age of 18, 9.50% from 18 to 24, 27.10% from 25 to 44, 25.10% from 45 to 64, and 16.00% who were 65 years of age or older.  The median age was 39 years. For every 100 females there were 122.20 males.  For every 100 females age 18 and over, there were 129.80 males.

The median income for a household in the county was $32,057, and the median income for a family was $38,235. Males had a median income of $30,061 versus $19,665 for females. The per capita income for the county was $15,886.  About 14.10% of families and 16.50% of the population were below the poverty line, including 22.20% of those under age 18 and 11.70% of those age 65 or over.

Government and infrastructure
The Federal Bureau of Prisons, Federal Correctional Institution, Three Rivers is located in unincorporated Live Oak County, near Three Rivers.

Politics
Live Oak County voted mostly Democratic for the first half of the 20th century. Dwight D. Eisenhower’s 1952 win was an exception. Jimmy Carter in 1976, however, was the last Democratic presidential candidate to carry the county, with Republicans winning since 1980.

Communities

Cities
 George West (county seat)
 Three Rivers

Village
 Pernitas Point (small part in Jim Wells County)

Unincorporated communities
 Dinero
 Oakville
 Ray Point
 Swinney Switch
 Whitsett

Ghost town
 Lebanon

Education
School districts include:
 George West Independent School District
 Mathis Independent School District
 Three Rivers Independent School District

Coastal Bend College (formerly Bee County College) is the county’s designated community college.

See also

 National Register of Historic Places listings in Live Oak County, Texas
 Recorded Texas Historic Landmarks in Live Oak County
 Live Oak County Courthouse
 Live Oak County Jail

References

External links
 Live Oak County government’s website
 
 "Live Oak County Profile" from the Texas Association of Counties
 Index of Landmarks

 
1856 establishments in Texas
Populated places established in 1856